The fourth season of the American television series The Masked Singer premiered on Fox on September 23, 2020, following a sneak peek episode that aired on September 13, and concluded on December 16, 2020. The season was won by singer LeAnn Rimes as "Sun", with singer Aloe Blacc finishing second as "Mushroom", and singer Nick Carter placing third as "Crocodile".

Panelists and host

Nick Cannon, singer-songwriter Robin Thicke, television and radio personality Jenny McCarthy Wahlberg, actor and comedian Ken Jeong, and recording artist Nicole Scherzinger all returned for their fourth season as host and panelists. Following controversial statements made on his podcast, it was confirmed that Cannon would remain as host of the show, after Fox accepted his apology.

Guest panelists included Joel McHale in the third and fourth episodes, season two winner Wayne Brady in the sixth episode, Niecy Nash in the seventh episode, Cheryl Hines in the eighth episode, Jay Pharoah in the ninth episode, and Craig Robinson in the tenth episode.

The panelists also engaged in a competition for the Golden Ear in this season. After each masked singer performed for the first time along with an initial clue package, each panelist wrote their first impressions-based guess at the identity of the celebrity and kept in a safe until the men in black are instructed to bring it out upon a contestant's elimination. Those guesses were revealed after each celebrity was unmasked, with panelist scoring a point for each celebrity they got correct from their initial first impression, with the panelist with the most correct answers winning the Golden Ear. Jenny McCarthy Wahlberg won the first Golden Ear for getting the most guesses correct.

Production 
Due to the COVID-19 pandemic in the United States, various industry-adopted safety protocols were implemented for production (as well as a change in location from Television City to Red Studios Hollywood), which included that the tapings to have a virtual audience, and that the judging panel would be 8 feet apart from each other. Fox Alternative Entertainment president Rob Wade said that the show would still "feel very much like" past seasons, having employed "various quarantining and various camera tricks" to preserve the visible presence of a studio audience.
Executive producer Craig Plestis stated that a goal for season four's costumes was to "increase the bonkers level and keep the production values up". A "virtual audience" was incorporated into voting. To accommodate social distancing, many of the clue packages used animation by Bento Box Entertainment, the studio behind Bob's Burgers as opposed to live-action filming typically used for their clue packaging.

Contestants
The season featured 16 contestants, including "Snow Owls" wearing the first duet costume with its own vehicle, the first costume to have animatronic parts ("Serpent"), and the first puppet costume ("Baby Alien"). The contestants in this season are reported to have a combined net worth over $398 million, 46 Grammy nominations, 23 platinum records, 10 Hall of Fame appearances, and one Olympic gold medal, to collectively have sold over 281 million records, appeared in over 5,475 episodes of television and 151 films, made five Super Bowl appearances, have four stars on the Hollywood Walk of Fame, hold three world records, one Time 100 honor, and one Oscar nomination in a major category.

Episodes

Week 1 (September 23)

Week 2 (September 30)

Week 3 (October 7)
Guest panelist performance: "Blurred Lines" by Robin Thicke performed by Joel McHale as "The Robin"

Week 4 (October 14)

Week 5 (October 28)

Week 6 (November 4)
Guest panelist performance: "Memories" by Maroon 5 performed by Wayne Brady as "Mr. TV".

Week 7 (November 11)
Group performance: "Raise Your Glass" by P!nk

Week 8 (November 18)

Week 9 (November 26)
Group performance: "I Want You Back" by The Jackson 5

Week 10 (December 2)
Group performance: "Take On Me" by A-ha

Guest panelist performance: "I Will Survive" by Gloria Gaynor performed by Craig Robinson

Week 11 (December 16) – Finale
Group performance: "Christmas (Baby Please Come Home)" by Darlene Love

Ratings

Notes

References

2020 American television seasons
The Masked Singer (American TV series)